is a near-Earth asteroid. It was discovered in May 2014 by astronomers at the Catalina Sky Survey near Tucson, Arizona - a project of NASA's NEO (Near Earth Object) Observations Program in collaboration with the University of Arizona.

Orbit and classification 

 belongs to the Apollo asteroids, which cross the orbit of Earth. Apollos are the largest group of near-Earth objects with nearly 10 thousand known members. It is also a potentially hazardous asteroid due to its sufficiently large size (an absolute magnitude brighter than 22), and its Earth-MOID (see below) of less than 0.05 AU.

It orbits the Sun at a distance of 0.25–3.90 AU once every 3 years (1,086 days; semi-major axis of 2.07 AU). Its orbit has an eccentricity of 0.89 and an inclination of 25° with respect to the ecliptic. This makes it also a Venus- and Mercury-crossing asteroid.

The body's observation arc begins with a precovery taken by Pan-STARRS in May 2011, or 3 years prior to its official first observation at Mount Lemmon.

Close approaches 

2017 Earth flyby 

 made a close flyby of Earth on 19 April 2017, and at its closest approach on that date came within 1.8 million kilometers (1.1 million miles) of the planet. It reached an apparent magnitude of 10.76.

Physical characteristics 

 is a peanut-shaped contact binary asteroid. It is an assumed to be a stony S-type asteroid. The overall shape of the asteroid also resembles the  “rubber ducky shaped” nucleus of Comet 67P/Churyumov-Gerasimenko.

Diameter and albedo 

Early estimation based on observed absolute magnitude and estimated albedo indicates object 600–1400 meters (m) in diameter. In 2014, further research based on NEOWISE data indicated an object of 650 m in diameter and albedo 0.25.

Based on a generic magnitude-to-mean-diameter conversion,  measures approximately 720 m in diameter, using an absolute magnitude of 18.1 and assuming an albedo of 0.20, which is typical for stony asteroids. The Collaborative Asteroid Lightcurve Link assumes an albedo of 0.20 and calculates a diameter of 818 meters based on an absolute magnitude of 17.8.

Observation of the asteroid with the Goldstone Solar System Radar were performed between April 15 and 21, 2017 by Arecibo Observatory and Goldstone Solar System Radar. Results show that the largest dimension of this contact binary is at least 870 meters.

Rotation period 

The 2017 radiometric observations at Arecibo and Goldstone also gave a rotation period of approximately 4.5 hours. Also in April 2017, a rotational lightcurve of this asteroid was obtained from photometric observations by Brian Warner at the Palmer Divide Station in California. Lightcurve analysis gave a refined period of 4.531 hours with a brightness amplitude between 0.14 and 0.64 magnitude.

Numbering and naming 

As of 2018, this minor planet has not been numbered or named.

Gallery 

Radar images of the asteroid were taken on 18 April 2017 by the Goldstone Solar System Radar:

In context
 on a graph plotting the closest flyby distance to Earth and size of NEOs in 2017.

References

External links 

 Asteroid to Fly Safely Past Earth on April 19, NASA news
 PIA21597: New Radar Images of Asteroid 2014 JO25, NASA/JPL, Photojournal
 2014 J025 Earth Flyby Trajectory Animation
 See A Potentially Hazardous Asteroid Zip By Earth Wednesday  Bob King, April 17, 2017
 The Face Of Earth-Approacher 2014 JO25 Bob King, April 19, 2017
 Asteroid 2014 JO25 Echoes Back Its Secrets Bob King, May 16, 2017
 NASA captures images of large asteroid flying by Earth  FOX News, 20 April 2017
 
 
 

Minor planet object articles (unnumbered)

20170419
Astronomical objects discovered in 2014